Maciej Rybus (born 19 August 1989) is a Polish professional footballer who plays as a left-back for Spartak Moscow in the Russian Premier League, and previously for the Poland national team.

Club career 
Rybus began his career with Pelikan Łowicz and was in summer 2006 sold to MSP Szamotuły, here played only one season and was than scouted by Legia Warsaw. He made his debut for Legia on 15 November 2007, in an Ekstraklasa Cup match against Dyskobolia Grodzisk Wielkopolski. Legia's coach Jan Urban, decided that the  player would join the first team. Rybus debuted in the Ekstraklasa on 24 November 2007. He played the 2007–08 season mainly as a substitute but earned a place in the starting eleven towards the end of the season. He scored his first goal in the Ekstraklasa in December 2007 against Górnik Zabrze. In April 2008, Rybus scored a brace in a league match against Wisła Kraków.

On 21 June 2016, he signed with Lyon. He played a total of 28 matches for the club.

On 19 July 2017, he signed a three-year contract with Russian side Lokomotiv Moscow, which was later renewed. Rybus left Lokomotiv on 31 May 2022 as his contract expired. Throughout his career at the club, he won one league title, two cup titles and a super cup.

On 11 June 2022, Rybus signed a two-year contract with Spartak Moscow. He scored his first goal in a 1-4 victory over Fakel Voronezh on 27 August 2022.

International career 
Rybus made his debut for the Poland national team against Romania in November 2009. In the next match against Canada, he scored his first goal. He also represented Poland at UEFA Euro 2012. In May 2018 he was named in Poland's preliminary 35-man squad for the 2018 FIFA World Cup in Russia.

On 20 June 2022, following his move to Russian side Spartak Moscow, Poland barred him from playing for his country. Playing for a Russian team during the Russian invasion of Ukraine was cited as the reason. This was despite the fact that the club's owner, Lukoil, was one of the only large Russian companies to have spoken out against the war.

Personal life
He is married to a Russian woman, Lana.

Career statistics

Club

International 

Scores and results list Poland's goal tally first.

Honours 
Legia Warsaw
 Polish Cup: 2007–08
 Polish SuperCup: 2007–08

Lokomotiv Moscow
 Russian Premier League: 2017–18
 Russian Cup: 2018–19, 2020–21
 Russian Super Cup: 2019

References

External links 

 Maciej Rybus at National Football Teams
 
 
 

1989 births
Living people
People from Łowicz
Sportspeople from Łódź Voivodeship
Polish footballers
Poland youth international footballers
Poland under-21 international footballers
Poland international footballers
Banned sportspeople
Association football defenders
Association football midfielders
Legia Warsaw players
FC Akhmat Grozny players
Olympique Lyonnais players
FC Lokomotiv Moscow players
FC Spartak Moscow players
Ekstraklasa players
Russian Premier League players
Ligue 1 players
UEFA Euro 2012 players
2018 FIFA World Cup players
UEFA Euro 2020 players
Polish expatriate footballers
Expatriate footballers in France
Expatriate footballers in Russia
Polish expatriate sportspeople in France
Polish expatriate sportspeople in Russia